Vilhelmiina (Mimmi) Haapasalo (née Jokinen; 16 November 1881, Kuorevesi - 16 May 1970) was a Finnish salesperson and politician. She was a member of the Parliament of Finland from 1913 to 1916, representing the Social Democratic Party of Finland (SDP).

References

1881 births
1970 deaths
People from Jämsä
People from Häme Province (Grand Duchy of Finland)
Social Democratic Party of Finland politicians
Members of the Parliament of Finland (1913–16)
20th-century Finnish women politicians
Women members of the Parliament of Finland